George D. Warriner High School for Personalized Learning is a public high school in Sheboygan, Wisconsin. Established in 2007, the school serves students in grades 9-12 and is part of the Sheboygan Area School District.

History 
Warriner High School opened in 2007 as Face 2 Face Charter School with a student enrollment of 20 students. The school changed its name when its founder, George D. Warriner, died in 2008.
  
The school is located in former Sheboygan County Chamber of Commerce office located at 712 Riverfront Drive in Downtown Sheboygan. Previously, the school was located at St. Clement Parish. Warriner Middle School is also located inside the same building as the high school.

See also 
 Sheboygan Area School District
 List of high schools in Wisconsin

References

External links 
 George D. Warriner High School

High schools in Sheboygan, Wisconsin
Educational institutions established in 2007
Public high schools in Wisconsin
Charter schools in Wisconsin
2007 establishments in Wisconsin